Baissea multiflora is a plant in the family Apocynaceae.

Description
Its fragrant flowers feature a white, pink or orange corolla. The plant's local traditional medicinal uses include as a treatment for colic, rheumatism, arthritis, kidney problems, haemorrhoids, lumbago, conjunctivitis, appendicitis, diarrhoea and gonorrhoea.

Distribution and habitat
Baissea multiflora is native to an area of tropical Africa from Senegal to Angola.

References

External links
 

multiflora
Plants used in traditional African medicine
Flora of Africa
Plants described in 1844